Texas RioGrande Legal Aid formerly Texas Rural Legal Aid (TRLA) is a nonprofit agency that specializes in providing free civil legal services to the poor in a 68-county service area.  It also operates a migrant farmworker legal assistance program in six southern states and a public defender program in southern rural counties of Texas.  Established in 1970, TRLA is the largest legal aid provider in Texas and the second largest in the United States.

TRLA's mission is to promote the dignity, self sufficiency, safety, and stability of low income Texans by providing high quality civil legal assistance and related educational services.
Every year the organization provides approximately 23,000 clients with legal services.  To be eligible, a client must be at or below 200% of federal poverty guidelines depending on the circumstances of the client.

TRLA is funded by grants and individual donations.  One of the organization's largest funders is the Legal Services Corporation.

History of TRLA 
Established in 1970, TRLA was created for the purpose of providing civil legal services to poor people in ten south Texas counties.  Judge James DeAnda, working through the Texas Trial Lawyers Association, sponsored the creation of TRLA for the purpose of receiving funds from the federal Office of Economic Opportunity (OEO).  David G. Hall was an original board member of the new organization but quickly became its Executive Director. Hall stepped down at the end of 2017, replaced by Robert Doggett, who has dedicated nearly 20 years to TRLA, litigating and providing guidance on cases involving FEMA aid, mortgage foreclosure, predatory lending, and other issues that disproportionately affect low-income people. 

In 1976, the newly organized Legal Services Corporation (LSC), an independent corporation created by Congress, funded hundreds of legal service programs across the country, including TRLA and organizations in urban areas of Southwest Texas.

During the Carter administration, LSC extended access to civil legal services to every county in the United States and its offshore possessions.  By 1980 TRLA had extended its operations to 47 counties in South and West Texas.  Austin's legal aid program, founded in 1966, was expanded to include the counties surrounding Travis and the Belton-Ford Hood area and became Legal Aid of Central Texas.  Corpus Christi's program in Nueces County was expanded to take on ten more counties in the Coastal Bend region and renamed as the Coastal Bend Legal Services program.

During the years of transition that began with President Reagan's initial attempt to dismantle LSC, LSC programs intensified their efforts to identify funding that could replace, if necessary, the federal money that enabled the provision of legal services to poor people.  The 1980s and 1990s saw intensified attacks upon federal funding and resulted in major reductions coupled with additional restrictions on clients who could be served, types of cases that could be taken, and means of advocacy.

In 1984 the Supreme Court of Texas created the Texas Equal Access to Justice Foundation (TEAJF) to administer funds to support civil legal services for low-income Texans.  The first source of those funds was the Interest on Lawyer Trust Accounts (IOLTA) program which allowed attorneys to pool short-term or nominal deposits made on behalf of clients or third parties into bank accounts in which the accrued interest would be distributed to nonprofit providers of free legal services.  In 1997 the Texas Legislature provided a new funding stream for TEAJF to administer when it required people who file lawsuits to include a small add-on fee dedicated to free legal services for low-income Texans.  In 2001 the Attorney General of Texas and the Texas Supreme Court agreed that TEAJF should administer a new Crime Victims Civil Legal Services fund dedicated to the provision of free legal services to low-income victims of crime.  Finally, in December 2006, the Supreme Court issued an order amending the IOLTA rules so that attorneys had to maintain their IOLTA accounts at banks that pay interest rates comparable to other similarly situated accounts.  The Supreme Court's action is expected to generate significant new funding for legal services.

On June 28, 2002, Coastal Bend Legal Services, Bexar County Legal Aid Association, El Paso Legal Assistance Society, and Legal Aid of Central Texas merged into Texas Rural Legal Aid, Inc. to form a new organization to provide legal services to low-income people in a 68-county area of Southwest Texas.

In January 2004, to signify the new program configuration, the name of the organization was changed to Texas RioGrande Legal Aid, Inc.  The service area now includes metropolitan areas of Austin, San Antonio, Corpus Christi, Laredo, El Paso, and the lower Rio Grande Valley.  And it has a statewide migrant farmworker program including Texas and the six southern states serviced by its Southern Migrant Legal Services office in Nashville, Tennessee (Kentucky, Tennessee, Alabama, Mississippi, Arkansas, and Louisiana).

Practice areas 
TRLA has more than 499 employees total, of which 93% are legal staff who work directly with clients in a variety of practice areas including:
ECONOMIC & SOCIAL JUSTICE colonias, consumer issues, disaster assistance, environmental justice, mental health, nonprofit organizations, taxes, wills, estates
FAMILY LAW domestic violence, sexual assault, protective orders, safety planning, child custody, divorce
HOUSING landlord-tenant disputes, foreclosures, discrimination, federally subsidized housing, manufactured homes, individuals with disabilities
INDIVIDUAL RIGHTS border issues, civil rights, criminal justice, disabilities, education, human trafficking, immigration, juvenile justice
LABOR & EMPLOYMENT displaced workers, farmworkers, small farms
PUBLIC BENEFITS health, homelessness, state and federal public benefits, veterans' benefits
PUBLIC DEFENSE regional rural public defender service

Office locations 
Texas RioGrande Legal Aid has offices located in many cities in its 68 county service area including: Alpine, Austin, Beeville, Brownsville, Corpus Christi, Del Rio, Eagle Pass, Edinburg, El Paso, Floresville, Harlingen, Laredo, Mercedes, Rio Grande City, San Antonio, Sinton, Uvalde, Victoria, and Weslaco.  TRLA also hosts its Southern Migrant Legal Services project in Nashville, Tennessee.

Special Programs 
To serve low-income and vulnerable communities with specific legal needs, TRLA has developed several Special Programs. Attorneys in these programs can meet the multiple legal needs of their clients by drawing on the services and expertise of other legal groups and practices within TRLA. 
Family Defense Project: Family Defense Project defends parental rights and preserves family integrity by representing parents involved with DFPS at various stages. FDP prioritizes advocacy during the following five stages, where an indigent parent is not entitled to a court-appointed attorney.
LGBTQ+ Civil Rights Project: This project is an intersectional effort within TRLA to combine expertise from various legal teams to serve the unique needs of low-income LGBTQ+ Texans in our service area.
Medical Legal Partnerships: Combines the expertise of attorneys and medical practitioners to improve the health of low-income people.
Operation Lone Star: Provides legal defense in Val Verde and Kinney counties.
Survivor's Rights Program: The Survivor’s Rights Program is a collection of projects that provide comprehensive assistance to people who have experienced domestic violence or sexual assault. The Program includes The Shelter Project, Bi-National Project, and Legal Aid for Survivors of Sexual Assault (LASSA).
The Texas Foster Youth Justice Project: Provides free legal aid to current and former foster youth.

Major Litigation 
Against FEMA
In August 2007, Texas RioGrande Legal Aid was involved in a case against the Federal Emergency Management Agency (FEMA).  According to the lawsuit, FEMA was prohibiting TRLA attorneys from being at their Disaster Recovery Centers to help victims of the summer floods.  TRLA claimed that this action was unjustified, a change from previous policy, violated freedom of speech, and violated victims' rights to legal representation.  Judge Sam Sparks ordered the organizations to meet and resolve the matter privately, wherein FEMA dropped its restrictions.  In the aftermath of the fires that covered California in late October, volunteer lawyers used the regulations in the new ABA-FEMA agreement to secure the same rights to helping fire victims secure legal help. This was the second time that TRLA had sued FEMA.

In November 2008, TRLA sued FEMA for a third time for discriminating against low-income victims of Hurricane Dolly when giving out aid.  In May 2009 a judge agreed with TRLA and ordered FEMA to define how it determines who gets aid after a disaster. 
The Border Wall
Also in December, TRLA began providing legal advice to border residents affected by the construction of a wall along the Texas-Mexico border.  TRLA's focus was to ensure that property owners were informed of their legal rights and did not feel intimidated or pressured to comply with government requests.
Defending the Mothers of Eldorado 
In 2008, TRLA began representing 48 mothers of the Fundamentalist Church of Jesus Christ of Latter Day Saints (FLDS)in the massive custody proceedings that resulted from a raid of the YFZ Ranch in Eldorado, Texas.  TRLA filed a writ of mandamus in the Third Court of Appeals in Austin, TX that resulted in ruling that Child Protective Services improperly removed more than 400 children from the ranch in early April.  The State of Texas appealed the decision to the Texas Supreme Court.  TRLA was victorious again and, as a result, all of the children were returned to their parents.  Because of their work on this case, TRLA was named Impact Player of the Year by Texas Lawyer magazine.

Sources

References

Legal Services Corporation
Legal aid in the United States
1970 establishments in Texas